|}

The Wokingham Stakes is a flat handicap horse race in Great Britain open to horses aged three years or older. It is run at Ascot over a distance of 6 furlongs (1,207 metres), and it is scheduled to take place each year in June.

History
The event is named after Wokingham, a market town several miles to the west of Ascot. It was established in 1813, and the inaugural running was won by Pointers, owned by the Duke of York. For many years the Wokingham Stakes was divided into two or three separate classes, but it became a single race in 1874, only 2020 ran a Silver Wokingham during COVID-19 pandemic.

The Wokingham Stakes is now contested on the final day of the five-day Royal Ascot meeting.

Records
Most successful horse since 1874 (2 wins):
 Wokingham – 1881, 1882
 Portland Bay – 1908, 1909
 Concerto – 1932, 1933
 Selhurstpark Flyer – 1997, 1998
 Rohaan - 2021, 2022

Leading jockey since 1874 (3 wins):
 Fred Archer – Trappist (1878), Despair (1883), Energy (1884)
 Otto Madden – Oatlands (1894), Kilcock (1896), Minstrel (1898)
 Harry Wragg – Santaquest (1921), Concerto (1932, 1933)
 Jack Sirett – Lucky Jordan (1947), White Cockade (1948), Jupiter (1953)
 Lester Piggott – Malka's Boy (1952), Ginnies Pet (1974), Boone's Cabin (1975)
 Willie Carson – Plummet (1973), Great Eastern (1981), Time Machine (1985)
 Johnny Murtagh – Nice One Clare (2001), Laddies Poker Two (2010), Deacon Blues (2011)

Leading trainer since 1874 (3 wins):
 Joe Cannon – Rosbach (1877), Trappist (1878), Warrior (1880)
 Richard Marsh – Oatlands (1894), Minstrel (1898), Golden Gleam (1906)
 Charles Morton – His Lordship (1902), Portland Bay (1908, 1909)
 Paul Cole – Calibina (1977), Queen's Pride (1980), Bel Byou (1987)

Winners since 1980
 Weights given in stones and pounds.

 The 2005 running took place at York.

Earlier winners

 1874: Josephine
 1875: Albanus
 1876: The Mandarin
 1877: Rosbach
 1878: Trappist
 1879: Philippine
 1880: Warrior
 1881: Wokingham
 1882: Wokingham
 1883: Despair
 1884: Energy
 1885: Corunna
 1886: Loved One
 1887: Everitt
 1888: Annamite
 1889: Bret Harte
 1890: Day Dawn
 1891: Rathbeal
 1892: Hildebert
 1893: Pitcher
 1894: Oatlands
 1895: Hebron
 1896: Kilcock
 1897: El Diablo
 1898: Minstrel
 1899: Eager
 1900: Bridge
 1901: Rose Tree
 1902: His Lordship
 1903: Glass Jug
 1904: Out o'Sight
 1905: Queen's Holiday
 1906: Golden Gleam
 1907: Forerunner II
 1908: Portland Bay
 1909: Portland Bay
 1910: Galleot
 1911: Meleager
 1912: Borrow
 1913: Braxted
 1914: Mount William
 1915–18: no race
 1919: Scatwell
 1920: Golden Orb
 1921: Santaquest
 1922: Proconsul
 1923: Crowdennis
 1924: Pandarus
 1925: Compiler
 1926: Capture Him
 1927: Nothing Venture
 1928: Hera
 1929: Six Wheeler
 1930: Grandmaster
 1931: Heronslea
 1932: Concerto
 1933: Concerto
 1934: Coroado
 1935: Theio
 1936: Cora Deans
 1937: Kong
 1938: Bold Ben
 1939: America
 1940–44: no race
 1945: Portamara
 1946: The Bug
 1947: Lucky Jordan
 1948: White Cockade
 1949: The Cobbler
 1950: Blue Book
 1951: Donore
 1952: Malka's Boy
 1953: Jupiter
 1954: March Past
 1955: The Plumber's Mate
 1956: Light Harvest
 1957: Dionisio
 1958: Magic Boy
 1959: Golden Leg
 1960: Silver King
 1961: Whistler's Daughter
 1962: Elco
 1963: Marcher
 1964: no race
 1965: Nunshoney
 1966: My Audrey
 1967: Spaniard's Mount
 1968: Charicles
 1969: Sky Rocket
 1970: Virginia Boy
 1971: Whistling Fool
 1972: Le Johnstan
 1973: Plummet
 1974: Ginnies Pet
 1975: Boone's Cabin
 1976: Import
 1977: Calibina
 1978: Equal Opportunity
 1979: Lord Rochford

See also
 Horse racing in Great Britain
 List of British flat horse races

References
 Paris-Turf:
 Racing Post:

 galopp-sieger.de – Wokingham Stakes.
 pedigreequery.com – Wokingham Handicap – Ascot.
 

Flat races in Great Britain
Ascot Racecourse
Open sprint category horse races
Recurring sporting events established in 1813
1813 establishments in England